Twelve men's teams competed in basketball at the 1984 Summer Olympics.

Group A

Australia

The following players represented Australia:

 Andy Campbell
 Andrew Gaze
 Brad Dalton
 Damian Keogh
 Danny Morseu
 Ian Davies
 Larry Sengstock
 Mark Dalton
 Mel Dalgleish
 Phil Smyth
 Ray Borner
 Wayne Carroll

Brazil

The following players represented Brazil:

 Gerson
 Israel
 Marcel
 Marcelo
 Carioquinha
 Oscar Schmidt
 Sílvio
 Adilson
 Eduardo Agra
 Marquinhos
 Nilo Guimarães
 Cadum

Egypt

The following players represented Egypt:

 Abdel Hadi El-Gazzar
 Abdel Kader Rabieh
 Ahmed Mohamed Marei
 Alain Attalah
 Amin Shouman
 Amir Abdel Meguid
 Essameldin Abou El-Nein
 Khaled Mohammed Bekhit
 Mohsen Medhat Warda
 Mohamed Khaled
 Mohamed Sayed Soliman
 Tarek El-Sabbagh

Italy

The following players represented Italy:

 Antonello Riva
 Carlo Caglieris
 Dino Meneghin
 Enrico Gilardi
 Marco Bonamico
 Pierluigi Marzorati
 Renato Villalta
 Renzo Vecchiato
 Roberto Brunamonti
 Roberto Premier
 Romeo Sacchetti
 Walter Magnifico

West Germany

The following players represented West Germany:

 Armin Sowa
 Christian Welp
 Christoph Körner
 Detlef Schrempf
 Ingo Mendel
 Klaus Zander
 Michael Pappert
 Ulrich Peters
 Uwe Blab
 Uwe Brauer
 Uwe Sauer
 Vladimir Kadlec

Yugoslavia

The following players represented Yugoslavia:

 Dražen Petrović
 Aleksandar Petrović
 Nebojša Zorkić
 Rajko Žižić
 Ivan Sunara
 Emir Mutapčić
 Sabit Hadžić
 Andro Knego
 Ratko Radovanović
 Mihovil Nakić-Vojnović
 Dražen Dalipagić
 Branko Vukićević

Group B

Canada

The following players represented Canada:

 Tony Simms
 Bill Wennington
 Danny Meagher
 Eli Pasquale
 Gerald Kazanowski
 Gord Herbert
 Greg Wiltjer
 Howard Kelsey
 Jay Triano
 John Hatch
 Karl Tilleman
 Romel Raffin

China

The following players represented China:

 Hu Zhangbao
 Huang Yunlong
 Ji Zhaoguang
 Kuang Lubin
 Li Yaguang
 Liu Jianli
 Lü Jinqing
 Sun Fengwu
 Wang Haibo
 Wang Libin
 Zhang Bin

France

The following players represented France:

 Éric Beugnot
 Grégor Beugnot
 Patrick Cham
 Richard Dacoury
 Jean-Luc Deganis
 Hervé Dubuisson
 Bangaly Kaba
 Jacques Monclar
 Stéphane Ostrowski
 Jean-Michel Sénégal
 Philippe Szanyiel
 Georges Vestris

Spain

The following players represented Spain:

 José Manuel Beirán
 José Luis Llorente
 Fernando Arcega
 Josep Maria Margall
 Andrés Jiménez
 Fernando Romay
 Fernando Martín
 Juan Antonio Corbalán
 Ignacio Solozábal
 Juan de la Cruz
 Juan Manuel López
 Juan Antonio San Epifanio

United States

The following players represented the United States:

 Steve Alford
 Leon Wood
 Patrick Ewing
 Vern Fleming
 Alvin Robertson
 Michael Jordan
 Joe Kleine
 Jon Koncak
 Wayman Tisdale
 Chris Mullin
 Sam Perkins
 Jeff Turner

Uruguay

The following players represented Uruguay:

 Víctor Frattini
 Luis Larrosa
 Horacio López
 Juan Mignone
 Hébert Núñez
 Carlos Peinado
 Horacio Perdomo
 Julio Pereyra
 Luis Pierri
 Wilfredo Ruiz
 Álvaro Tito

References

1984